Patrick Blair may refer to:
 Patrick Blair (rugby union)
 Patrick Blair (surgeon)